Jarosław Rusiecki (born 20 July 1961 in Stary Nieskurzów) is a Polish politician. He was elected to the Sejm on 25 September 2005, getting 4009 votes in 33 Kielce district as a candidate from the Law and Justice list.

See also
Members of Polish Sejm 2005-2007

References
Jarosław Rusiecki - parliamentary page - includes declarations of interest, voting record, and transcripts of speeches.

1961 births
Living people
People from Opatów County
Law and Justice politicians
Members of the Polish Sejm 2005–2007
Members of the Polish Sejm 2007–2011
Members of the Polish Sejm 2011–2015
Members of the Senate of Poland 2011–2015
Members of the Senate of Poland 2015–2019
Members of the Senate of Poland 2019–2023